Liolaemus donosobarrosi, also known commonly as Donoso-Barros' tree iguana, is a species of lizard in the family  Liolaemidae. The species is endemic to Argentina.

Etymology
The specific name, donosobarrosi, is in honor of Chilean herpetologist Roberto Donoso-Barros.

Geographic range
L. donosobarrosi is found in central Argentina, in the provinces of Mendoza, Neuquén, and Río Negro.

Habitat

Reproduction
L. donosobarrosi is oviparous.

References

Further reading
Cei JM (1974). "Two New Species of Ctenoblepharis (Reptilia, Iguanidae) from the Arid Environments of the Central Argentina (Mendoza Province)". Journal of Herpetology 8 (1): 71–75. (Ctenoblepharis donosobarrosi, new species). Corrigendum: J. Herp. 8 (4): 388.
Cei JM (1979). "A Reassessment of the Genus Ctenoblepharis (Reptilia, Sauria, Iguanidae) with a Description of a New Subspecies of Liolaemus multimaculatus from Western Argentina". J. Herp. 13 (3): 297–302. (Liolaemus donosobarrosi, new combination).
Etheridge RE (2000). "A Review of Lizards of the Liolaemus wiegmannii Group (Squamata, Iguania, Tropiduridae), and a History of Morphological Change in the Sand-Dwelling Species". Herpetological Monographs 14: 293–352.
Scrocchi GJ, Abdala CS, Nori J, Zaher H (2010). Reptiles de la provincia de Río Negro, Argentina. Viedma, Argentina: Fondo Editorial Rionegrino. 249 pp. (in Spanish).

donosobarrosi
Reptiles described in 1974
Reptiles of Argentina
Taxa named by José Miguel Alfredo María Cei